Dicephalarcha is a genus of moths belonging to the subfamily Olethreutinae of the family Tortricidae.

Species
Dicephalarcha acupicta Diakonoff, 1973
Dicephalarcha anemodes (Meyrick, 1912)
Dicephalarcha atava Diakonoff, 1973
Dicephalarcha dependens (Meyrick, 1922)
Dicephalarcha dimorpha (Meyrick, 1909)
Dicephalarcha herbosa (Meyrick, 1909)
Dicephalarcha monometalla Diakonoff, 1973
Dicephalarcha sicca Diakonoff, 1973

See also
List of Tortricidae genera

References

External links
tortricidae.com

Olethreutini
Tortricidae genera
Taxa named by Alexey Diakonoff